Tarachodes taboranus is a species of praying mantis in the family Eremiaphilidae.

Distribution 
This species can be found in Tanzania.

See also
List of mantis genera and species

References

Tarachodes
Insects described in 1909